Eresina rougeoti, the Rougeot's eresina, is a butterfly in the family Lycaenidae. It is found in Sierra Leone, Ivory Coast, Nigeria, Cameroon, Bioko, Gabon, the Republic of the Congo, the Democratic Republic of the Congo (Kinshasa), Uganda and north-western Tanzania. Its habitat consists of dense, primary forests.

References

Butterflies described in 1956
Poritiinae